Curved Air are an English progressive rock group formed in 1970 by musicians from mixed artistic backgrounds, including classical, folk, and electronic sound. The resulting sound of the band is a mixture of progressive rock, folk rock, and fusion with classical elements. Curved Air released eight studio albums, the first three of which broke into the UK Top 20, and had a hit single with "Back Street Luv" (1971) which reached number 4 in the UK Singles Chart.

Band history

Sisyphus
The group evolved out of the band Sisyphus, who played one of their early gigs in the ballroom of Leith Hill Place, Surrey for a masked ball and which was formed by Darryl Way (who studied violin at Dartington College and the Royal College of Music) and Francis Monkman, a member of the Royal Academy of Music. While wandering through an outlet store of the Orange Music Electronic Company, Monkman was intrigued by the sound of Way testing his first electrically amplified violin, and the two "got to talking." They discovered they had a lot in common, and in 1969 invited pianist Nick Simon who, along with bassist Rob Martin and drummer Florian Pilkington-Miksa, completed the line-up of Sisyphus. "Darryl and Nick were very much into Spirit. One could cite them as a formative influence for Curved Air", Monkman later remembered. Many of the early Curved Air songs were written for Sisyphus, among them "Young Mother in Style" and "Screw".

Sisyphus was hired to provide accompaniment for Galt MacDermot's new play, Who the Murderer Was, at the Mercury Theatre in Notting Hill Gate, serving as the pit band. Mark Hanau, an aspiring band manager at the time, saw the show and decided he wanted to manage Sisyphus. He felt that Sonja Kristina, an aspiring folk musician who he had seen in the London stage production of Hair, was the missing ingredient in the group. On 1 January 1970, Hanau contacted her through the singer and impresario Roy Guest. She listened to a cassette of the band's music and was impressed. With Kristina's joining and Nick Simon's departure, Sisyphus metamorphosed into Curved Air, named after the album A Rainbow in Curved Air by contemporary composer Terry Riley. The name was suggested by Monkman who, having played in the first London performance of In C, was a great fan of Riley. The band's new sound immediately came together, and the five-piece Curved Air was born, Sonja Kristina being both the band's voice and its sex symbol.

From formation to first breakup

After a series of intensive rehearsals in Martin's family home in Gloucestershire, the five-piece launched a well-received U.K. tour, supporting Black Sabbath at one point. The band toured with their own sound engineer, Shaun Davies (later the producer for Way's post-Curved Air band, Wolf), which allowed them to achieve a better on-stage sound mix than other groups with unusual combinations of instruments. Shaun's father, Guy Davies, made the perspex violins used by Way and later Jobson. Curved Air publicist Tony Brainsby fanned the enthusiastic audience response and a bidding war for the band ensued, and in summer 1970 Curved Air signed with Warner Bros., becoming the first British band on the company's roster. The band received a much-publicized advance of £100,000 and their debut album Air Conditioning was released in November notable for its being issued as the first commercially available LP picture disc in the UK. The album reached number 8 in the UK Albums Chart, preceded by a single, "It Happened Today". John Peel picked up on the band and they performed on several Peel radio Sessions and Roundhouse ‘Implosion’ events. 

Bass player Rob Martin left due to a hand injury, and was replaced by Ian Eyre. The band released "Back Street Luv" which reached number 4 in the UK Singles Chart to become the band's most successful single to date. The Second Album peaked at number 11. A non-LP follow-up single, "Sarah's Concern", went by unnoticed.

The band played three U.S. tours and built a cult following there. In the course of constant touring drummer Pilkington-Miksa actually became ill in late 1971 and for several months Barry de Souza (Lou Reed, Jeff Beck, Kate Bush), who band members knew from studio work, sat in for him. It was DeSouza who played with Curved Air at the 1971 Beat Club German T.V performance of "Back Street Luv", the televised version of which became well known. In late 1971 Sonja Kristina joined 
Faces, Soft Machine, Marc Bolan and David Bedford to do a Christmas radio show for the BBC.

One highlighted performance was on 7 May 1971 when Curved Air was the opening act for B.B. King and Johnny Winter at the Warehouse in New Orleans.

By the time of the third album release serious musical differences within the band emerged. According to Sonja Kristina's Cherry Red interview (2007), Francis was fascinated with overtones and natural harmonies, and "His other obsession is/was jamming... real 'out there' cosmic rock jamming. And that is not Darryl at all... He's a very disciplined perfectionist, he likes things to be as precise and exquisite as possible. Whereas Francis is completely the opposite way; he just wants to play and things just come out of the cosmos". As Monkman explained,Basically Darryl and I respect each others' work, but we don't really see eye-to-eye on most things. And we never really got the co-writing thing together. I wanted to get my first "epic" together, so it looks like a split forming at the time of the Second Album. In fact, the centre was never really solid after Rob left.

This division was reflected in the arrangement of tracks on Second Album and Phantasmagoria; side A of both albums was occupied by music composed by Darryl Way, while side B was devoted solely to Monkman's compositions, with no true collaboration between the two writers. While working in the studio the band was in a dire condition. "I remember the moment when Clifford Davis, our manager after Mark Hanau, spelled out what we were going to have to do just to get somewhere near even. We felt burned out", Monkman later said. By the end of 1972 Monkman was a self-admitted "nervous wreck"  and on the verge of physical and mental breakdown. He had to wear earplugs to go on the London Underground and went to a naturopath three times a week.

Phantasmagoria was recorded with bassist/guitarist Mike Wedgwood, who replaced Eyre. The album's title was drawn from the Lewis Carroll poem of the same title. The album came out in April 1972 and reached number 20 in the U.K.

Curved Air split up, Way formed Darryl Way's Wolf, Pilkington-Miksa joined Kiki Dee's band, and Monkman moved into session work and was later to play in, among others, the supergroup Sky.

The new Curved Air
Having retained a good working relationship, Sonja Kristina and Mike Wedgwood formed a new band with Kirby Gregory (electric guitar), Eddie Jobson (keyboards, violin), and Jim Russell (drums). Jobson had come from a band called Fat Grapple, who had been one of Curved Air's support acts on tour. The new musicians brought more direct rock energy, with young prodigy Eddie Jobson, influenced by Curved Air, kept the classical blend strongly in the mix.  On the suggestion of manager Clifford Davis, they continued using the name Curved Air with the approval and support of the departing band members.

Kristina later commented:What I wanted to do with the band at the time was get more of a rock edge to it, and Kirby's guitar playing really excited me – he was just really wild. And Jim was the same way, a very solid rock drummer. Mike and I really wanted to continue, and it was our manager Clifford Davis who said we would do a better business continuing to call the band Curved Air. So we kept the name and followed along the same pattern as before, as a writer's band. Everybody in the new band contributed material except for Jim Russell, who really wasn't a writer. Before it had mainly been Darryl and Francis, but I had managed to get some of my compositions in.
Whereas all three of the original Curved Air's albums had broken the UK top 20, the new band's sole album, Air Cut, failed to  chart at the time.

Not long after the release  Eddie Jobson was asked to replace Brian Eno in Roxy Music, so Kirby Gregory and Jim Russell both left the group to form Stretch.  Sonja Kristina recorded a demo tape for Warner Brothers but they discontinued the contract. (These demos were later issued as part of the Lovechild record.)  Mike Wedgwood joined Caravan.

Reunion
In 1974 Chrysalis sued the band. "We had broken their contract on the advice of Clifford Davis, who said we could prove that they had not been acting in our best interests, but by then he was no longer our manager!" Monkman explained. In order to discharge an enormous unpaid VAT bill, in September 1974 the band's mainstays (Kristina, Way, Monkman, and Pilkington-Miksa) reunited for a three-week tour of the UK, put together by Darryl Way's manager, Miles Copeland III. The reunion interrupted Way's new band, Stark Naked and the Car Thieves, and since the bass slot for Curved Air needed filling, Way brought along the new band's bassist, Phil Kohn.

The reunion tour saw Sonja Kristina play her role as Curved Air's sex symbol far more dramatically than she had before. Between the band's previous breakup and the reunion tour she had worked as a croupier at the London Playboy Club and returned to the stage with Curved Air in see through lace, feathers and beads, highlighting her sexuality.

A live album and single were recorded during the lauded three week reunion tour, and they succeeded in paying off the tax bill. With their debts paid, Monkman and Pilkington-Miksa had no more reason to remain in the band. And so, Curved Air broke up for the third time in as many years.

Stark Naked, the Car Thieves, and Curved Air
However, Darryl Way wanted to continue Curved Air with Sonja Kristina. Way brought in two more "Car Thieves", guitarist Mick Jacques and drummer Stewart Copeland, Miles Copeland III's brother. Now more members of this new lineup came from Stark Naked and the Car Thieves than Curved Air . With Darryl Way at the helm, this new band often employed the same classical and folk influences as the original band and played the now classic Curved Air songs at their shows), but their core sound was rooted in pop, rhythm and blues, and hard rock. Miles Copeland III, still serving as Curved Air's manager, put the group on his own label, BTM.

The band kicked off with a European tour, which started poorly. Way, a notorious perfectionist, grew impatient with the struggling of his bandmates, especially novice drummer Copeland. Eventually, the musicians found a way of working together and became a popular live act.

The group struggled with studio work. Phil Kohn left and the band, unable to replace him in time for the sessions for Midnight Wire, relied on guest musicians to play both bass (John G Perry) and keyboards (Peter Wood). Norma Tager, a friend of Kristina's, penned the lyrics to the "Midnight Wire" songs. Kohn was later replaced by Tony Reeves, formerly of Colosseum and Greenslade, but the recording sessions for both Midnight Wire and 1976's Airborne were expensive and highly stressful for everyone involved. Both albums – as well as "Desiree", a single drawn from Airborne – failed to break the charts.

Citing dissatisfaction with BTM Records' inability to support Curved Air financially, Way departed. Though Alex Richman from the Butts Band stepped in on keyboards, the loss of the band's de facto leader was a blow. This line-up's final release was a cover version of "Baby Please Don't Go” and although the shows were sold out and always successful the new recordings did not chart. After months of gradually losing steam, Curved Air broke up so quietly that, by Sonja Kristina's recollections, most of the music press wrote off the band's absence as a "sabbatical". Copeland formed The Police, Reeves returned to work as a producer and played in semi-pro band Big Chief along with Jacques, and Kristina and Way both pursued solo careers. Kristina and Copeland maintained the close personal relationship they'd formed while bandmates and were married in 1982.

Interim
Curved Air as a group were largely inactive for the next three decades, though a handful of retrospective releases and compilations were released during this time. (Warner Bros. Records released the band's first compilation, "The Best of Curved Air", in April 1976, though it naturally only contained material from the band's four Warner Bros. albums.)

In 1984 Darryl Way asked Sonja Kristina to provide vocals to several of his solo recordings, two of which, "Renegade" and "We're Only Human", were released as a single under the Curved Air name. A third track, a cover of "O Fortuna", was released as a Sonja Kristina solo track on the b-side to "Walk on By", but was withdrawn due to objections from the Carl Orff estate. Yet another track, "As Long as There's a Spark", was originally recorded by Way and Kristina, but released as a Darryl Way solo track, with Way performing the vocals himself. Way and Kristina followed these recordings with a short tour in 1988, again under the Curved Air name.

In 1990 the original Kristina, Way, Monkman and Pilkington-Miksa quartet gave a one-off reunion concert at the London's Town & Country, supported by Noden's Ictus. The performance, recorded by Francis Monkman, was captured on the Alive, 1990 album, released in 2000.

Following the one-off reunion, guitarist Mike Gore instigated a series of jam sessions which involved three fifths of Curved Air's original lineup: Monkman, Pilkington-Miksa, and Martin. In 1991 several of these jams were recorded, ultimately being released as a Monkman solo album called Jam in 2002.

2008 onwards
In early 2008, the band regrouped. On 4 May 2008, in a message to the Curved Air Yahoo Group, Kristina advised that the new line-up would be herself, Darryl Way (violin), Florian Pilkington-Miksa (drums), Andy Christie (guitar) and Chris Harris (bass). Francis Monkman, who was originally pictured with Kristina, Way and Pilkington-Miksa for the reunion, left the project. "Unfortunately, he didn't have the same vision as the rest of us as to how (the new project) should be approached and wasn't prepared to compromise, so our ways had to part", commented Way. Sonja Kristina confirmed, "Francis was in at the beginning but had extremely different ideas from Darryl about how he wanted this new Curved Air to prepare and develop. Eventually, he withdrew. We continued with Darryl as our musical director and producer." The new line-up played in Southern England, Italy and Malta in 2008.

In 2008 a CD/box set Reborn was released, with 12 re-recorded Curved Air tracks and two new songs ("Coming Home" and "The Fury"). Two of the oldies, "Melinda" and "Elfin Boy", were reworked and produced by Marvin Ayres. As Way explained, the band had two reasons for this: they were never satisfied with the way those tracks were originally recorded and they wanted to have the product that they owned and were in control of. "Reborn was our way of preparing for the live work", Sonja Kristina added. On Friday, 13 June, Curved Air performed at the Isle of Wight Festival to a generally positive response.

For the 2009 dates in Japan on 16 and 17 January at Club Citta, Kawasaki, the guitarist was Kit Morgan who replaced Christie. On 9 August 2009, Eddie Jobson stood in for Darryl Way at a one-off gig in Chislehurst.

A live album consisting of recordings from the previous UK tour, Live Atmosphere, was released on 2 April 2012.

Way was indisposed for their dates in October 2009 and Robert Norton (keyboards) and Paul Sax (violin) stood in for him. Sax had played on Sonja Kristina's 1991 album Songs from The Acid Folk and both Sax and Norton played on her 1995 album Harmonics of Love. "Robert Norton is exceptional – as is Paul Sax, a master violinist – one of the first entrants to the Yehudi Menuhin school – a passionate and brave performer very well qualified to step into Darryl's light ... Chris Harris is literally our root on bass and Kit Morgan the fire on guitar. Great chemistry and communication," Sonja Kristina commented. This lineup (Kristina, Pilkington-Miksa, Harris, Morgan, Sax and Norton) continued to gig as Curved Air until 2013. The band played at the London High Voltage Festival 2011 (23–24 July), alongside Spock's Beard, Jethro Tull, Dream Theater, and Queensrÿche, among others.

In October 2013, Kirby Gregory returned to replace Kit Morgan on guitar. The new lineup (Kristina, Pilkington-Miksa, Harris, Gregory, Sax and Norton) initially played a couple of dates in the UK before recording a new studio album, North Star, released on 17 March 2014, supported by a 10-date tour from 1 March to 19 April with the Acoustic Strawbs and Martin Turner's Wishbone Ash.

On 4 September 2015, Curved Air played a special concert at Under The Bridge, London, to mark the 45th Anniversary of the release of Air Conditioning. The album was played in full for the first time ever. The band was joined on stage by Darryl Way for "Vivaldi" and two other songs. Ian Eyre also played bass during "Back Street Luv".

Kit Morgan returned to the band in November 2016, replacing Kirby Gregory, but left in August 2018 because of problems with his back, so former Purson guitarist George Hudson made his live debut with the band at The New Day Festival in Kent. Florian Pilkington-Miksa left in November 2017 and was replaced by Andy Tween.

In 2019 Kirby Gregory returned on guitar in place of Hudson, and Grzegorz Gadziomski replaced Paul Sax on violin, both playing with the band at London's 100 Club on 17 October.

Personnel

Members
Current members
 Sonja Kristina – vocals (1970–1976, 1984, 1988, 1990, 2008–present)
 Chris Harris – bass (2008–present)
 Robert Norton – keyboards (2009–present)
 Andy Tween – drums (2017–present)
 Grzegorz Gadziomski - violin (2019–present)
 Kirby Gregory – guitar (1972–1973, 2013–2016, 2019–present)

Former members
 Darryl Way – violin, keyboards, backing vocals, guitars, drum machine (1970–1972, 1974–1976, 1984, 1988, 1990, 2008–2009)
 Francis Monkman – keyboards, guitar (1970–1972, 1974, 1990)
 Florian Pilkington-Miksa – drums (1970–1972, 1974, 1990, 2008–2017)
 Rob Martin – bass guitar (1970; substitute - 1990)
 Ian Paul Eyre – bass guitar (1970–1971) (born 1951, died 2022)
 Mike Wedgwood – bass guitar, vocals, guitar (1971–1973)
 Eddie Jobson – keyboards, violin (1972–1973; substitute – 2009)
 Jim Russell – drums (1972–1973)
 Phil Kohn – bass guitar (1974–1975)
 Stewart Copeland – drums (1975–1976)
 Mick Jacques – guitars (1975–1976)
 Tony Reeves – bass, keyboards (1975–1976)
 Alex Richman – keyboards (1976)
 Andy Christie – guitar (2008–2009)
 Kit Morgan – guitar (2009–2013, 2016–2018)
 Paul Sax – violin (2009–2019)
 George Hudson - guitar (2018–2019)

Substitute musicians
 Barry de Souza – drums (1971; filled in for Pilkington-Miksa)

Lineups

Timeline

Discography

Studio albums

Other albums

Singles

References

External links

Deram Records artists
English progressive rock groups
Musical groups established in 1969
Warner Records artists
Female-fronted musical groups